Richard Lockhart (born 3 January 1963) is a New Zealand swimmer. He competed in two events at the 1988 Summer Olympics. Lockhart also represented New Zealand in the 1983, 1985 and 1987 World Student Games.

Biography
In 1986, Lockhart competed in 100 and 200 Breaststroke at the XIII Commonwealth Games held in Edinburgh, Scotland.  In the 100 Breaststroke, he swam a time of 1:06.74 earning him 13th place overall. In the 200 Breaststroke, he swam a time of 2:25.50 earning him 13th place behind fellow New Zealand swimmer Grant Forbes (2:24.89).  In the same year, he also competed at the 1986 FINA World Swimming Championships held in Madrid.  

During the 1988 Summer Olympic Games, Lockhart competed in the men's 100 meter and 200 meter Breaststroke events. During the 100 Breaststroke, Lockhart finished 46th out of 61 competitors. In the 200 Breaststroke, he finished 36th out of 53 competitors.

In 1990, Lockhart returned to the XIV Commonwealth Games held in Auckland, New Zealand swimming the 100 and 200 Breaststroke as well as the Breaststroke leg on the 4x100 men's Medley Relay. In the 100 Breaststroke he finished in 10th place overall with a time of 1:05.05. During the 200 Breaststroke, he finished 10th with a time of 2:23.46 just ahead of fellow countryman Grant Forbes (2:23.53).  Later in 1990, Lockhart retired from swimming.

After a 14 year break, Lockhart continues to swim today in masters events and has competed at the past two World Masters Games (2009 and 2013) where he claimed six gold medals in the pool.  In 2014 Lockhart was named New Zealand Masters Swimmer of the Year at the annual Swimming New Zealand Awards.

References

External links
 

1963 births
Living people
New Zealand male breaststroke swimmers
Olympic swimmers of New Zealand
Swimmers at the 1988 Summer Olympics
Swimmers from Wellington City
20th-century New Zealand people
21st-century New Zealand people